A hex map, hex board, or hex grid is a game board design commonly used in wargames of all scales. The map is subdivided into a hexagonal tiling, small regular hexagons of identical size.

Advantages and disadvantages
The primary advantage of a hex map over a traditional square grid map is that the distance between the center of each and every pair of adjacent hex cells (or hex) is the same. By comparison, in a square grid map, the distance from the center of each square cell to the center of the four diagonal adjacent cells it shares a corner with is  times that of the distance to the center of the four adjacent cells it shares an edge with. This equidistant property of all adjacent hexes is desirable for games in which the measurement of movement is a factor. The other advantage is the fact that neighbouring cells always share edges; there are no two cells with contact at only a point.

One disadvantage of a hex map is that hexes have adjacent cells in only six directions instead of eight, as in a square grid map. Commonly, cells will form continuous straight lines "up" and "down", or "north" and "south", in which case the other four adjacent cells lie "north-west", "north-east", "south-west" and "south-east". As a result, no hex cell has an adjacent hex cell lying directly east or west of it, making "horizontal" movement in a straight line impossible. Instead, paths in these directions, and any other path that does not bisect one of the six cell edges, will "zig-zag;" since no two directions are orthogonal, it is impossible to move forward in one direction without moving backwards slightly in the other.

Games that traditionally use the four cardinal directions, or otherwise suit a square grid, may adapt to a hex grid in different ways. For example, hexagonal chess replaces the four directions of orthogonal movement (along ranks and files) with the six directions to adjacent cells, through cell edges. The four directions of diagonal movement are likewise replaced with the six directions that lie through vertices of the cell; these "diagonal" movements travel along the edge between a pair of adjacent cells before arriving at another cell. A three-colour grid aids in visualising this movement, since it preserves the traditional chessboard's property that pieces moving diagonally land only on cells of the same colour.

Uses
The hex map has been a favourite for game designers since 1961, when Charles S. Roberts of the Avalon Hill game company published the second edition of Gettysburg with a hex map.  The hex grid is a distinguishing feature of the games from many wargame publishers, and a few other games (such as The Settlers of Catan).

The hex map has also been popular for role-playing game wilderness maps. They were used in the Dungeons & Dragons boxed sets of the 1980s and related TSR products. GDW also used a hex grid map in mapping space for their science-fiction RPG Traveller.

A few abstract games are played on a hex grid, such as
 Abalone. 
 the six games of the GIPF series.
 Hex.
 Havannah.
 Y.
 Chinese Checkers and several variants of chess have also been invented for a hex board. 

The television game show Blockbusters from the 1980s was also based on a hex grid. 

Early examples of strategy video games that use hex maps include 1983's Nobunaga's Ambition, 1989's Military Madness (the first entry in the Nectaris series), and 1991's Master of Monsters. The first Civilization had a hex map version during development, but designers decided against it because "the world was not ready ... it was too freaky". While the first four iterations of the popular Civilization computer game franchise used square maps, Civilization V and Civilization VI use hexagonal maps. Other games that uses hex maps are The Battle for Wesnoth, Dragon Age Journeys, Heroes of Might and Magic III, Forge of Empires and UniWar.

See also
 Hexxagon, a board game
 Hexagonal tiling
 Agon (game), a two player game played on a 6×6×6 hexagonal gameboard

References

External links

 mkhexgrid, a hex grid and hex paper utility
 Free online hexagonal graph paper PDF generator
 Hexographer, a program for making role-playing game wilderness hex maps in a "classic" style
 Hextml, an online program to make hex maps
 GM Friend hex mapping tool, an online program to make hex maps with a random map generator
 RedBlobGames, Hexagonal Grids, a reference for hexagonal grid algorithms
 supraHex A supra-hexagonal map for analysing high-dimensional omics data.
 mathematical discussion of implementing the x,y,z axis in hexagonal applications
 Unreal Engine 4 HexMap grid extension

Board game terminology
Map types